Samambwa Secondary School is a rural co-educational secondary school in Mabura ward of Kwekwe District.

It is situated 19 km north of Empress, Columbina Township, 86 km southwest of Kadoma and 114 km northwest-north of Kwekwe by road.

Background

It was established in 1984.

Name origins

The school name comes from the name of a local chieftain. 
See Samambwa Name Origins

Operations

Samambwa Secondary School offers secondary education from Form 1 to 4 over fours for both sexes.

In Zimbabwe it is a requirement to pass at least five O'Level Subjects including English, Mathematics and Science, and so this school offers Mathematics, Integrated Sciences,  English Language, Religious Studies, History, Geography, Commerce, Shona Language and Agriculture.

Form 1 students here are mostly Grade 7 graduates from the nearby Samambwa Primary School, a few from Somapani Primary School and Mangwarangwara Primary School which are both about 7 km away.

A good number of O'Level graduates from here go to either Sidakeni High School or Nyaradzo High School for a further two years in A'Level education.

See also

 Zhombe Mabura Ward
 Mabura Schools
 List of schools in Zimbabwe Zhombe Secondary Schools

References 

Schools in Zimbabwe